Manoj Nair was an Indian writer, musician and journalist. He had worked for various news portals such as The Indian Express, The Asian Age, The Economic Times, Outlook Magazine, Hindustan Times.

Early life
Nair was from Irinjalakkuda, Thrissur district. He did his schooling from Patna.

Career
Nair was a musician, writer and journalist. He had worked for various news portals such as The Indian Express, The Asian Age, The Economic Times, Outlook Magazine, Hindustan Times. He had worked with The Economic Times from August 2004 to January 2012. He was an event editor of Kochi Muziris Biennale.

Death
At the age of 49, he was found dead at his residence in Fort Kochi.

Books
 Pencil Sketches
 Between the Rock and a Hard Place (Unreleased)

Novels
 Dictionary of an Alcoholic (unreleased)

References

Indian male journalists
People from Thrissur district